Zarchu may refer to:
 Zarchu, Bardsir
 Zarchu, Jiroft